The Ciurea rail disaster, known in Romania as the Ciurea catastrophe, occurred on 13 January 1917, during World War I. It occurred at Ciurea Station, in Iași County, a train station with a passing loop, located on the railway line from Iași to Bârlad. There was no formal investigation and the exact cause of the accident is unknown. The death toll is also uncertain, with most sources indicating between 800 and 1,000 deaths. With these estimates, the Ciurea rail disaster is the second worst rail accident in world history by death toll, after the 2004 Sri Lanka tsunami train wreck.

The accident

Train E-1, nicknamed "The Courier", consisting of 26 cars, left Galați for Iași on Friday, . It was running several hours late as the station had been bombed by German airplanes and its locomotive had been hit by bombs and had to be replaced. The train included residents of Muntenia, who felt threatened by German bombs falling in nearby Galați, as well as the occupation of Brăila by the German Army. They were joined on the train by students and soldiers on leave. As well as Romanians, the train's passengers included Russian officers and soldiers, and members of the French military mission. Among the best-known travellers were Emil Costinescu, a former Minister of Finance, Yvonne Blondel, daughter of a former French ambassador to Bucharest, geographer George Vâlsan, and a French official, the Marquis de Belloy. The train quickly became overcrowded, and more cars were added as the train proceeded along its route, with the train sometimes waiting for hours as hundreds of travellers tried to find space.

Travel conditions were terrible: the wagons, many of them boxcars, illuminated by gas lamps, were cold; the windows had no glass, but planks that could not keep out the cold air. Travellers sitting on the roofs of the wagons died from the cold temperatures. "To our horror, a man and a 10-year-old boy were taken down frozen. Other shadows that were staggering, hardened by cold, recounted that, at some curves, many people – men and women – had been thrown off the train," Yvonne Blondel wrote.

The train stopped overnight in Bârlad after heavy snowfall had blocked the line, despite the efforts of soldiers and railwaymen to clear it. The next day, on 12 January, the convoy continued towards Iași, traveling . It reached Ciurea around one o'clock the next morning, when the accident occurred.

After the last stop at Bârnova, the train reached Ciurea station, just a few kilometers from Iași. When the crew members tried to reduce speed, they realised that the brakes, despite having been checked at Bălteni station, were not functioning. According to the newspaper "Mișcarea", the compressed air brake system functioned only for the first two wagons, the valve being accidentally closed at the third wagon. The train derailed and collided with a locomotive standing on another line. A survivor commented: "I sensed perfectly how the train jumped off the rails like a monstrous reptile of iron and steel, pulling all its travelers to mutilation or on the great journey to beyond... I had the feeling that I was thrown into the bottom of a pit, a rain of objects sliding around my body... How long did this torment last? A few minutes, but to me it seemed interminable...".

Receiving signals sent by the engineers of the stricken locomotives, Ciurea railway station employees activated a switch so that the train would enter line 2 and avoid collision with wagons filled with tar that were stopped on line 1. Because of the high speed and sharp angle, however, only the locomotive and one wagon managed to enter line 2; all but two of the other cars derailed. It seems that at least one of the wagons collided with some fuel tanks, triggering an explosion and a huge fire. The train burned in less than two hours. Yvonne Blondel was rescued by two soldiers of the French military mission, who pulled her out of the train wreck exactly when her clothes were ablaze. Other passengers died in the fire or were killed by the impact of the derailment. Those traveling on the roofs of the wagons were either thrown under the train cars and crushed, or thrown into the snow. The same French survivor describes  the scenes of the tragedy, including the emergence of looters, who robbed the travellers. Teams of rescuers arrived soon after – soldiers of the ammunition depot near the train station, railway workers, two companies of Romanian soldiers, and two companies of Russian soldiers. The survivors were transported to the Iași railway station, where they were given first aid.

Lack of information
The lack of information on the accident is due primarily to the exceptional situation in which the Romanian state found itself at the time. The Kingdom of Romania was at war with the Central Powers, and the government, the military, and most citizens took refuge in Moldavia, while Muntenia, including its capital Bucharest, and Dobruja were occupied. Given the national crisis, few newspapers reported the accident. It is not very clear whether there was an investigation, or what its results may have been.  Primary sources of information are limited to the testimony of survivors, memoirs, press, and interwar publications that have addressed the issue.

Likewise, doubts have been cast on whether the photo of the accident circulated by the media was authentic and depicted the actual derailment at Ciurea. As such, this photo is not dated correctly. It is known that Ciurea was the site of several railway accidents during the early twentieth century, with one known incident taking place in 1925. The photo may well have been taken on one of those other occasions.

Aftermath
In the first hours after the accident, several officials arrived at the scene – , Minister of Public Works, the prosecutor general, the prefect of Iași, but also security agents who began to question witnesses. By the morning, the news of the accident had spread throughout the city. Daylight revealed the magnitude of the tragedy: "Passing through Ciurea I looked the disaster: wagons crushed, burned and teams of workers drew more dead from under the wreck. Behind the station the dead were lined up in four rows ...  several hundreds. With eyes removed, heads broken, arms detached, hands, legs, burned bodies. Women, officers, soldiers...". Another notes: "A whole string of wagons burnt, not even with their  the metal skeletion, soaked like wax by the fire that consumed it... around the station everything seemed ruins and grave...".

Hundreds of bodies were found among the twisted metal remnants of the train cars. The victims were laid out near the station and countless calls were made to people to help identify them. Very few of the bodies were ever identified. They were buried in mass graves on the field behind the Ciurea station, for the victims identified by then – 374 people. 

Among the dead were lieutenant Vasile Cantacuzino, son of eminent jurist and politician Matei B. Cantacuzino, and commander Alexandru Cătuneanu, author of the first navigation map of the Black Sea. The historian Vasile Pârvan was injured in the accident, and so was the geographer George Vâlsan.

Over the next several days, provisional lists of names of the identified dead were announced. Rumours soon began to spread: there were discussions about fortunes destroyed in the fire or looted by thieves, the death toll was amplified, and famous names were fraudulently added to the lists of victims. In German-occupied Muntenia, a memoirist wrote about reports of the accident, noting with malicious joy "the death of Take Ionescu, Cantacuzino (Minister of Justice), Costinescu (Minister of Finance)".

Memorials
In January 2017, a wayside cross (troiță) was erected by the Ciurea town hall near the train station in memory of the unidentified victims of the 1917 disaster. Next to the cross, the Romanian Maritime Hydrographic Directorate installed a commemorative plaque for commander Alexandru Cătuneanu.

References

Railway accidents in 1917
Runaway train disasters
Iași County
1917 in Romania
Derailments in Romania
January 1917 events